A hook ladder, also known as a pompier ladder (from the French pompier meaning firefighter) is a type of ladder that can be attached to a window sill or similar ledge by the use of a hooked extending bill with serrations on the underside. The hooked ladder then hangs suspended vertically down the face of the building.

The ladder was developed to access buildings via enclosed alleys, lightwells and yards to which other types of ladder could not be taken. A pair of men and two ladders could be used to scale a building to considerable heights, by climbing from floor to floor and taking the ladders up behind and pitching to the next floor.

The original French design was a single beam ladder with pairs of rungs projected outward on both sides of the beam. Hook ladders can be used to scale from floor to floor on multi-storey buildings by way of exterior windows. The ladders hook onto the window ledge by a "gooseneck" projecting from the top.

See also
Glossary of firefighting terms

References

External links
 Firemen competing at "Pompier ladder" event
 A video of the Pomiper ladder in use

Firefighting equipment
Ladders

de:Leiter (Gerät)#Hakenleiter